The Joliet Transportation Center is a multimodal mass transit center linking passenger bus routes, two Metra commuter trains, and Amtrak passenger trains in the city of Joliet, Illinois. It has replaced Joliet Union Station as the commuter and passenger train station serving Joliet. Union Station ceased to provide train service in September 2014, and groundbreaking for the new station took place late in 2016, with construction beginning shortly afterward. After several delays, the station officially opened to Amtrak and Metra traffic on April 11, 2018. It is the only Metra station outside of its Chicago stations where two lines terminate. In Metra's zone-based fare system, Joliet is in zone H on both lines.

As of 2018, Joliet is the 51st busiest of Metra's 236 non-downtown stations, with an average of 996 weekday boardings.

As of 2022, on Metra's Rock Island Line, Joliet is served by 21 trains in each direction on weekdays, by 10 inbound trains and 11 outbound trains on Saturdays, and by eight trains in each direction on Sundays.

On Metra's Heritage Corridor, Joliet is served by three inbound trains in the morning and three outbound trains in the evening on weekdays only.

As of 2022, Amtrak hopes, in the future, to reroute its trains serving Joliet from the CN trackage currently used by both Amtrak and Metra Heritage Corridor trains to travel between Chicago Union Station and Joliet to instead travel along the trackage used by the Metra Rock Island District as part of a number of large-budget projects to improve its operations in the Chicago-area. If this occurs, Amtrak intends to construct a new platform at the Joliet Transportation Center designed to serve Amtrak trains traveling into and out of Chicago on Rock Island District trackage.

References

External links

Amtrak stations in Illinois
Buildings and structures in Joliet, Illinois
Metra stations in Illinois
Transportation buildings and structures in Will County, Illinois
Transportation in Joliet, Illinois
Railway stations in the United States opened in 2018